María Eugenia Bielsa Caldera (born 10 March 1958) is an Argentine Justicialist Party politician, born in Rosario, Santa Fe. She was the vice-governor of Santa Fe, accompanying governor Jorge Obeid, from 2003 until 2007. As such, she also presides the provincial Senate. She is the sister of politician Rafael Bielsa and of football coach Marcelo Bielsa. From 2019 to 2020 she served as Minister of Territorial Development and Habitat in the cabinet of Alberto Fernández.

Bielsa is an architect, and she taught at the Faculty of Architecture of the National University of Rosario. She is married to an architect and has a son who is studying the same career.

Prior to the 2005 legislative elections, President Néstor Kirchner asked Bielsa to run for a highly contested seat at the national Chamber of Deputies, but she refused, stating that she had a mandate to finish her term in the office for which she was elected. Governor Obeid again asked Bielsa to run for mayor of Rosario in the 2007 general elections at the end of their term. She did not explicitly refuse or accept that request at the time,

but eventually other mayoral candidates presented themselves instead. 

Bielsa was elected to be a council member in Rosario's municipal election as head of the Bloque Encuentro por Rosario.

References

Justicialist Party politicians
People from Rosario, Santa Fe
Living people
1958 births
Argentine architects
Women government ministers of Argentina
Vice Governors of Santa Fe Province
21st-century Argentine women politicians
21st-century Argentine politicians
Housing ministers
National University of Rosario alumni